is a monthly automobile magazine dedicated to drifting and was the first of its kind. Published by San-Ei Shobo Publishing in both print and video format, it is the sister publication to Option, Option2 and Video Option. Until 2007, when rival magazine D to D was published, it was the only magazine dedicated to the art of driving sideways.

History
Drift Tengoku was launched in April 1996 as part of Option2. At that time, printed quarterly, it mainly published drifting related articles such as tuning as well as covering drifting contests, it also covered illegal gatherings that took place on public road, especially at the touge. These features usually led to police visits to the magazine's office.

The magazine featured many of the now notable drifting drivers such as Ken Nomura and Nobuteru Taniguchi. At the following year, the magazine went bimonthly and the year following that, it went monthly.  It was not until February 1999 that the magazine was published as a standalone magazine.  The magazine celebrated its 100th issue in September 2007.  The video version is different from the print as it solely covers drifting events run by the magazine.

References

External links
Official website

1996 establishments in Japan
Auto racing magazines
Bi-monthly magazines
Automobile magazines published in Japan
Monthly magazines published in Japan
Magazines established in 1996
Quarterly magazines